Crosshill is a small village in South Ayrshire, Scotland.

Crosshill has a primary school.

References

Villages in Carrick, Scotland